Sun City is the first and only album by Artists United Against Apartheid, released on October 25, 1985, by EMI Manhattan Records.  The Little Steven-led project features contributions from more than 50 artist from the rock, hip hop, soul, funk, jazz, reggae, latin, and world music genres. The album contains two versions of the "Sun City" protest song against apartheid in South Africa as well as other selections in the same vein from that project.

History
Initially intending to record the song "Sun City" for his third solo album Freedom – No Compromise, Little Steven (real name Steven Van Zandt) instead approached producer Arthur Baker to help record a "We Are the World"-inspired anti-apartheid protest single. In the song, Van Zandt urges artists to boycott the Sun City resort in South Africa, where artists such as Queen, Elton John, Linda Ronstadt and Rod Stewart have accepted invitations to perform. Van Zandts's mission was to raise awareness of the racial segregation enforced by the white government in South Africa, and to encourage the cultural boycott the United Nations had imposed in the early 1980s. "I had been doing research on American foreign policies," Van Zandt said, "and South Africa was on my list of engagements we were involved with, which I felt our government was on the wrong side of. By then, I had heard Peter Gabriel's "Biko," which was just a terrific inspiration."

With assistance from ABC News journalist Danny Schechter, Van Zandt and Baker assembled a wide variety of artists from Bruce Springsteen, Bob Dylan and Lou Reed to Gil Scott-Heron, Miles Davis and Africa Bambaataa. Rock critic Dave Marsh called it "the most diverse line up of popular musicians ever assembled for a single session." However, the recordings quickly became an album-length project of its own, and the Sun City album was recorded in summer 1985 at 15 different recording studios in New York, Los Angeles, Boston, Dublin and London.

In addition to the title track, other songs were recorded at the time to complete an album's worth of material. Drummer-musician Keith LeBlanc and Danny Schechter came up with  "Revolutionary Situation", an audio-collage set to music that took its title from the words of South Africa's then-interior minister Louis Nel condemning the state of the country.  Amid a background of yapping police dogs, sounds of mayhem and revolt in the township, LeBlanc and Schechter mixed in angry declarations by activists like Alan Boesak, Bishop Archbishop Desmond Tutu and Nelson Mandela's daughter Zindzi, looped with what was at that time the most recent interview with her father, recorded in 1961.

"No More Apartheid" is an improvisational piece featuring Peter Gabriel and Indian violinist L. Shankar. "Peter Gabriel came in and just started chanting. Weird African chant, out of nowhere ... Then he started harmonizing with himself," Van Zandt recalled. Drummer Keith LeBlanc then added drums to the chant, and Van Zandt put down guitar and synthesizer parts. 

Inspired by meetings with other artists who volunteered, Bono of U2 went back to his hotel room and wrote "Silver and Gold" the same evening. The song was quickly recorded, with guitarists Keith Richards and Ron Wood of the Rolling Stones, and drummer Steve Jordan. Wood's guitar work is notable for using Keith's switchblade as a slide. "Silver and Gold" was also distributed separately as a promotional single. A last-minute inclusion, the song was left off the track listings of the original 1985 album and cassette pressings and considered to be a hidden track. Bono later explained, in an appearance on the US syndicated radio show "Rockline" with Bob Coburn, that he submitted the tape of the song after the album's artwork had been printed by EMI Manhattan Records. When Razor and Tie reissued the album in 1993, the song was included on the track listings. U2 also recorded two versions of the song: a live version in the Rattle and Hum film and album, and a studio version on the B-side of "Where the Streets Have No Name".

"The scariest encounter of the Sun City project had to be Miles Davis," recalled Van Zandt. "I wrote the intro for him to play… He's just not friendly. He makes Lou Reed look like a pussycat… He came in, sat down and I played him the "Silver and Gold" tape. He's sitting next to me, and he talks real low and slow, and right in my ear: "Hey man, do you want me to fucking play or what?" So he does his take, and I asked him to redo it with the mute on. I went and reassembled his old quintet with Herbie Hancock, Ron Carter on bass and Tony Williams on drums."

"Let Me See Your I.D." – based on a line from Gil Scott-Heron's "Johannesburg" – features vocal contributions from Scott-Heron and various rappers and singers. All were told to feel free to express their feelings about the subject any way they wanted lyrically. Then audio from news footage, excerpts from Nelson Mandela's speeches, and sound effects were added, and turned into an anti-apartheid montage.

Critical reception
Music critic Robert Christgau felt that each side of the album closes with "a well-meaning failure", writing that "Revolutionary Situation"'s "collage of indistinct South African voices over Keith LeBlanc humdrum is an object lesson in political correctness that might have made a collectible B, and Bono's country blues is simply ignorant." He added that Gil Scott-Heron's "superrap" on "Let Me See Your I.D." "is as astute and moving rhythmically as it is ideologically," and that "No More Apartheid" is a "worthy successor" to Peter Gabriel's "Biko." Christgau also highlighted the two versions of the title track, which he felt "can grow on you in a big way." 

AllMusic's Stephen Thomas Erlewine wrote retrospectively that the album is "extremely listenable," saying, "it's one of the few charity or protest albums that stands up to repeated listenings, thanks to the extended instrumental workouts." Unlike Robert Christgau, Erlewine felt that "Silver and Gold" was "the finest moment" on the album. Trouser Press called the album "a powerful record given weight by the cause and the challenge."

Release

Sun City was a modest success, reaching #31 on the Billboard 200 pop albums chart. It did much better in terms of critical reaction, placing at #5 on the Pazz & Jop Critics Poll for albums for that year. Sun City got the final spot on Rolling Stone'''s list of the best 100 albums of the 1980s in 1989 and 2016.

The album was issued on CD by Razor & Tie in 1993 – but, after the end of apartheid in 1994, eventually went out of print.

In 2019, the album was remastered for release as part of Van Zandt's career-spanning box set Rock N Roll Rebel: The Early Work. The digital deluxe edition of the album was released on December 6, 2019 containing four bonus tracks. The digital deluxe edition also includes the reissued Let Me See Your I.D.'' bonus EP.

Track listing
Adapted from the 2019 reissue liner notes.

Personnel
Adapted from the 2019 reissue liner notes, except where noted.

Musicians
 Afrika Bambaataa, Stiv Bators, Pat Benatar, Big Youth, Rubén Blades, Kurtis Blow,   Bono, Duke Bootee, Jackson Browne, Jimmy Cliff, George Clinton, Will Downing, Bob Dylan, the Fat Boys, Peter Gabriel, Peter Garrett, Bob Geldof, Daryl Hall, Nona Hendryx, Linton Kwesi Johnson, Kashif, Eddie Kendricks, Darlene Love, Malopoets, Grandmaster Melle Mel, Michael Monroe, John Oates, Bonnie Raitt, Joey Ramone, Lou Reed, David Ruffin, Run-DMC, Scorpio, Gil Scott-Heron, Bruce Springsteen, Via Afrika, Peter Wolf, Bobby Womack – vocals
 Ringo Starr – drums
 Zak Starkey – drums
 Keith LeBlanc – drums, drum programming
 Tony Williams – drums
 Steve Jordan – drums
 Little Steven – guitar, keyboards, drum programming
 Pete Townshend – guitar
 Stanley Jordan – guitar
 Keith Richards – guitar
 Ron Wood – guitar
 Doug Wimbish – bass
 Ron Carter – acoustic bass
 Herbie Hancock – keyboards
 Richard Scher – keyboards
 Robby Kilgore – keyboards
 Zoë Yanakis – additional keyboards
 Miles Davis – trumpet
 Clarence Clemons – saxophone
 L. Shankar – double violin
 Ray Barretto – conga, vocals
 Sonny Okosuns – talking drum, vocals 
 Jam Master Jay – scratching
 DJ Cheese – scratching
 Benjamin Newman – drum programming
 B.J. Nelson – background vocals
 Lotti Golden – background vocals
 Tina B. – background vocals
 Daryl Hannah – additional background vocals
 Kevin McCormick – additional background vocals
 The Dunnes Stores Strikers – additional background vocals
 Annie Brody Dutka – additional background vocals
 Robert Gordon – additional background vocals
 Steve Walker – additional background vocals

Technical
 Little Steven – producer 
 Arthur Baker – producer, mixing (bonus EP: tracks 1-3), remixing (tracks 10, 11)
 Zoë Yanakis – production assistance
 Keith LeBlanc – additional production assistance (track 3), editing (bonus EP: tracks 1-3) 
 Robbie Kilgore – additional production assistance (track 2)
 Chris Lord-Alge – engineer, mixing, additional production assistance (track 2)
 Tom Lord-Alge – engineer, mixing, additional production assistance (track 2)
 John Davenport – engineer, mixing
 Peter Darmi – engineer, mixing
 Rob Paustin – engineer 
 Jeff Hendrickson – engineer 
 Andy Wallace – engineer
 James Geddes – engineer
 Steve Kahn – engineer
 George Tutko – engineer
 Bobby Cohen – engineer
 Pat McCarthy – engineer
 Michael Smith – engineer
 Mike O'Donnell – engineer
 Bill Price – engineer
 Gary Wright – engineer
 Steve Peck – engineer
 Roey Shamir – engineer
 Jamie Chaleff, Lenny Bernstein, Mark Russack, David Sussman, Steve Boyer, Ken Steiger, Scott Church, Rob Rushing, Bridget Daly, Chris Lunwinski, Mike Nicoletti, Ken Collins, Steve Antebi, Kevin Maloney, Tony Viamontes, Stephen Scharrott, Barbara Milne, Alan Friedman – assistant engineer
 Frank Filipetti – mixing
 Jay Burnett – mixing 
 Aldo Marin – mixing (bonus EP: tracks 1-3), editing (tracks 10, 11, bonus EP: tracks 1-3)
 Albert Cabrera – editing (bonus EP: tracks 1-3)
 Bob Ludwig – mastering
 Herb Powers – original mastering (bonus EP: tracks 1-3)
 Tony Wright – cover art design
 Rosemary Intrieri/Koppel & Scher – art direction

Charts

References

1985 albums
International opposition to apartheid in South Africa
Albums produced by Steven Van Zandt
Albums produced by Arthur Baker (musician)
Music in the movement against apartheid
Manhattan Records albums